Vladimir Dmitrievich Vilensky-Sibiryakov (8 July 1888 – 2 July 1942) was a Russian Bolshevik revolutionary and political activist involved in the Russian Revolution in Siberia and later a Soviet Comintern representative and historian.

Vladimir was born in Tomsk, Siberia. He was orphaned as a child and became a foundry worker, joining the Tomsk Social-Democrats before the 1905 revolution. He was arrested in 1908 for distributing revolutionary literature amongst the railway workers on Ilanskaya railway station.

In 1919 Vilensky was appointed by the Russian Communist Party as the plenipotentiary for Far Eastern Affairs. He went to Vladivostok, where he established what evolved into the Far Eastern Bureau of the Comintern, originally the Far Eastern Bureau of the Russian Communist Party.

He was active in the Society of Former Political Convicts and Exiles (OPK), for a period, editing the journal Katorga i ssylka (Hard Labour
and Exile).

He was expelled from the Communist Party of the Soviet Union in 1927, accused of anti-party fractional work. But he was reinstated in 1931, only to be expelled again in 1936.

Vilensky-Sibiryakov was sentenced to 8 years of forced labour. He died out of exhaustion in a gulag in Ilansky. He was posthumously rehabilitated in 1957.

References

1888 births
1942 deaths
Russian revolutionaries
Old Bolsheviks
Soviet rehabilitations
Gulag memoirs
Soviet journalists
Soviet historians
People from Tomsk
Comintern people
Soviet diplomats
People of the Russian Revolution
People of the Russian Civil War
People who died in the Gulag